The 2022 Asia Cup Qualifier was a men's cricket tournament which took place in Oman in August 2022 to determine qualification for the 2022 Asia Cup (which was originally scheduled to be played in 2020). The 2020 editions of the ACC Western and Eastern Region T20 tournaments were held in February and March 2020 by the Asian Cricket Council (ACC), with thirteen teams competing in total (eight in the Western event and five in the Eastern event) with the aim of progressing to the qualifier. These were scheduled to be followed by the Asia Cup Qualifier tournament in Malaysia, which was due to be played in August 2020. However, in July 2020, the Asia Cup was postponed due to the COVID-19 pandemic, resulting in the postponement of the Qualifier. In May 2021, the Asian Cricket Council confirmed that there would be no Asia Cup in 2021, with that edition of the tournament deferred until 2023. It was later announced that there would be a T20I Asia Cup in 2022, to be hosted by the United Arab Emirates.

Summary
The Western Region qualifier was held by the Gulf Cooperation Council (GCC) in Oman in February 2020 and the Eastern region qualifier was held in Thailand from 29 February to 6 March 2020. UAE and Kuwait advanced to the main Asia Cup Qualifier after reaching the final of the Western Region event and they were joined by Singapore and Hong Kong who finished in the top two positions in the Eastern event. These four teams contested the Asia Cup Qualifier to determine the sixth team to take part in the 2022 Asia Cup (joining the five Asian Full Members of the International Cricket Council).

China were originally scheduled to take part in the Eastern Region Group, but they withdrew in February 2020 due to the COVID-19 pandemic. Bhutan and Myanmar, who were also included in the original schedule, later withdrew their participation. On 23 February 2020, Iran played their first ever T20I match, when they faced the United Arab Emirates in Group B of the Western Region qualifier.

All matches in the qualification tournaments had Twenty20 International (T20I) status.

Teams

2020 ACC Western Region T20

The 2020 ACC Western Region T20 tournament was held from 23 to 27 February 2020 in Muscat, Oman, and acted as a first qualifying stage for the 2020 Asia Cup. Bahrain, Kuwait, Maldives, Oman, Saudi Arabia and the UAE all announced their squads for the tournament. Following the conclusion of the group stage matches of the Western Region, Bahrain, Kuwait, Qatar and the UAE had all progressed to the semi-finals.

An incredible six-wicket win for Bahrain over Qatar in the final group match saw them climb to the top of Group A, with both sides progressing to the semi-finals at the expense of favourites Oman by virtue of slightly better net run rates. Kuwait and the UAE won their respective semi-final matches to advance to the final of the Western Region group and to the Asia Cup Qualifier. United Arab Emirates went on to win the final by 102 runs.

Group stage

Group A

Group B

Play-offs

Semi-final 1

Semi-final 2

Final

2020 ACC Eastern Region T20

The 2020 ACC Eastern Region T20 tournament took place from 29 February to 6 March 2020 in Bangkok, Thailand, and acted as a first qualifying stage for the 2020 Asia Cup. It was the first official men's T20I tournament to be played in Thailand. China were initially due to play in the Eastern Region tournament, but were forced to withdraw due to the COVID-19 pandemic. Bhutan and Myanmar were also included in the original schedule, but later withdrew. Hong Kong, Malaysia, Nepal and Singapore all announced their squads for the tournament, with Aizaz Khan, Ahmad Faiz, Gyanendra Malla and Amjad Mahboob as their respective captains.

The opening day of the tournament saw the hosts beaten by Singapore, followed by a surprise defeat for the much-fancied Nepal against Malaysia, who came into the event on the back of a 5–0 series whitewash against Hong Kong. Nepal were beaten again on day two, this time by Hong Kong, and Thailand also suffered a second defeat with Malaysia taking a second victory. Singapore thrashed the in-form Malaysians by 128 runs on day three thanks to an unbeaten 92 from just 32 balls for Tim David, and they were joined by Hong Kong on a record of two wins from two matches after their comfortable victory over Thailand. After the penultimate round of matches, Nepal were eliminated despite Sandeep Lamichhane bowling a world record 22 dot ball deliveries in their victory over Thailand, due to Singapore's 16-run win over Hong Kong. The result also secured Singapore's qualification, and meant that the game between Hong Kong and Malaysia on the final day would determine the remaining place in the Asia Cup Qualifier. Singapore won the tournament unbeaten with seven points, after their last fixture against Nepal was abandoned due to rain. Hong Kong's victory over Malaysia in the last match of the tournament secured their qualification. Singapore's Tim David was named player of the tournament, while compatriot Sidhant Singh and Hong Kong's Aftab Hussain won the batting and bowling awards, respectively.

Round-robin

2022 Asia Cup Qualifier
The four-team Asia Cup Qualifier was originally scheduled to take place in Kuala Lumpur in August 2020. The qualifier was held in Oman in August 2022, immediately before the Asia Cup.

Kuwait and the UAE reached the final of the Western Region group, and as a result, also advanced to the Asia Cup Qualifier. Singapore and Hong Kong finished as the top two teams in the Eastern Region group, joining Kuwait and the UAE in the Asia Cup Qualifier. However, in July 2020, the Asia Cup was postponed to June 2021 due to the COVID-19 pandemic. The Asia Cup was again postponed to August and September 2022, with the qualifier started on 20 August 2022. Originally scheduled to take place in Sri Lanka, both the Qualifier and the Asia Cup were moved to Oman and the UAE respectively due to the economic and political crisis in Sri Lanka.

Hong Kong qualified for the main event after a first-place finish in the qualifier.

Squads

Round-robin

References

External links
 Series home at ESPN Cricinfo (Western Region T20)
 Series home at ESPN Cricinfo (Eastern Region T20)
 Series home at ESPN Cricinfo (Asia Cup Qualifier)

 
Associate international cricket competitions in 2019–20
Associate international cricket competitions in 2022
Asia Cup Qualifier
Asia Cup Qualification